Būta Kōlā, also referred to as daiva kōlā or nēmā, is a ritual dance performance prevalent among the Hindus of Tulu Nadu and parts of Kasargod in northern Kerala, India. The dance is highly stylized and performed as part of 'Bhootaradhana' or worship of the local deities worshipped by the Tulu speaking population. It has influenced Yakshagana folk theatre. Būta kōlā is closely related to Theyyam of neighbouring Malayalam-speaking populations.

List of Daivas 
Koragajja is the most worshipped Daiva by the Tulu people and is prayed to for help in solving any problem, to get back something lost, or to get any work done on time.

Panjurli, a boar spirit that is worshipped to ward off the menace of wild boars in order to protect the crops. According to Tulu mythology, a wild boar perished in Lord Shiva's pleasure garden. The young boar's offspring was adopted by Goddess Parvati. The young boar became destructive as he grew older and began destroying the plants and trees in Lord Shiva's garden. Lord Shiva became upset by this and decided to kill him. Goddess Parvati, however, defended the boar and asked her husband to pardon him. So instead of killing him, Lord Shiva banished the boar to earth and tasked him with protecting the people of earth. This particular became a Bhoota (divine spirit) known as Panjurli.

Bobbarya, the God of the seas who is worshipped mostly by members of the fishing community.

Kalkuda and Kallurti are Daivas who are brother and sister. According to legend, Kalkuda was a great sculptor who built the Sravan Belgola. After he completed building beautiful temples and monumental statues, the ruler of Karkal cut off his left arm and right leg so that he could not create such beautiful sculptures for any other king. On seeing her brother's state, Kallurti vowed to take revenge and requested Mahadeva to turn them into Daivas. They then took violent revenge on the king, his family and his kingdom. Their destruction was only stopped when a master magician promised them that they would be worshipped as and how they wanted.

Guliga, as per legend was born out of a stone. The goddess Parvati discovered this stone in a pile of ash. Guliga was created when Lord Shiva flung this ash into the water and was sent to Lord Vishnu after his birth so that he may serve him. However, Guliga was extremely destructive and this greatly annoyed Lord Vishnu. Lord Vishnu exiled Guliga to Earth as a result.

Kōṭi Cennayya, Koti and Chennayya are twin heroes who are worshipped as martial Gods.

Etymology 

The word is derived from būta (Tulu for ‘spirit’, ‘deity’; in turn derived from Sanskrit भूत for ‘free elements’, 'which is purified', 'fit', 'proper', ‘true’, 'past', 'creatures'; Anglicized: ‘bhūta’, ‘bhoota’, ‘bootha’) and kōla (Tulu for ‘play, performance, festival’, or 'shape/form').

A bhūta kōlā or nēmā is typically an annual ritual performance where local spirits or deities (bhūtas, daivas) are being channelised by ritual specialists from certain scheduled castes such as the Nalike, Pambada, or Parawa communities. The bhūta cult is prevalent among the Tuluvas of Tulu Nadu region. The word kōla is conventionally reserved for the worship of a single spirit whereas a nēma involves the channelising of several spirits in hierarchical order. In kōlas and nēmas family and village disputes are referred to the spirit for mediation and adjudication. In feudal times, the justice aspect of the ritual included matters of political justice, such as the legitimation of political authority, as well as aspects of distributive justice. The produce of land directly owned by the būta (commons) as well as certain contributions from the leading manors was redistributed among the villagers.

Bhūta worship types 
The Bhūta worship of Dakshina Kannada is of four kinds,  kōla, bandi, nēma, and agelu-tambila.
Kōla: Demi god dancing, is offered to the Bhūtas in the sthana of the village believed that which they are supposed to reside.
Bandi:  Bandi is the same as kōla, with the addition of dragging about a chariot, on which the one who is representing the Bhūta is seated; most often, he is from the nalke, pambada or ajala communities.
Nēma: Nēma is a private ceremony in honour of the Bhūtas, held in the house of anyone who is so inclined. It is performed once in every year, two, ten, fifteen, or twenty years by well-to-do families.
Agelu-tambila:  is a kind of worship offered only to the family people, wherein rice, dishes, meat, alcohol are served on plantain leaves and offered to spirits, deities, departed forefathers annually or once wishes are completed.

Performance 
The ritual performance at a būta kōla or daiva nēma involves music, dance, recital, and elaborate costumes. Recitals in Old Tulu recount the origins of the deity and tell the story of how it came to the present location. These epics are known as pāḍdanas.

Types of daivas 
Thurston counts among the best known deities "Brahmeru, Kodamanitaya, Kukkintaya, Jumadi, Sarala Jumadi, Pancha Jumadi, Lekkesiri, Panjurli (a divine boar), Kuppe Panjurli, Rakta Panjurli, Jarandaya, Urundarayya, Hosadēvata (or Hosa Bhūta or Posa appe), Dēvanajiri, Kalkuḍa, Tukkateri, Guliga, Babbariya (or Bobbarāyā), Neecha, Duggalaya, Mahisandaya, Varte, Koragajja, Chāmundi, Baiderukulu, Ukkatiri, Kallurti, Shiraadi, Ullalthi, Okkuballala, Korddabbu, Ullaya, Korathi, Siri, Mantridevathe, Rakteshwari, Istadevathe and Odityay. The Bhūtas are supposed to belong to different castes. For example Okkuballala and Dēvanajiri are Jains, Kodamanitaya and Kukkinataya are Bunts, Kalkuḍa is a smith, Bobbariya is a Māppilla, and Nicha a Koraga." Some of them are ancestral spirits such as Bobbariya, Kalkuḍa, Kallurti, Siri, Kumār Koti and Chennayya. Some are deified wild animals such as the boar -  (the female counterpart is ) or the tiger - .

Some būtas are Androgynous such as some instances of Jumadi who is represented as female below the neck (breasts), but with a male head sporting a mustache. There are anthropomorphic būtas, zoomorphic ones, and mixed forms (such as the Malarāya of Kodlamogaru, Kasargod, who has the head of a wild boar and the body of a woman).

Depending on the significance of the people who worship them,  or  can be family deities, local or village deities, or deities associated with administrative units such as manorial estates, groups of estates, districts or even small kingdoms (royal būtas or rājandaivās).

Cosmology 
According to the ethnographer Peter Claus, the Tulu  reveal a cosmology which is distinctly Dravidian and thus different from the Puranic Hindu cosmology. Importantly, priesthood is not the preserve of a caste learned in scriptures but is shared between the ruling aristocracy on one hand and ritual specialists from the lower strata of society on the other hand. The world is divided in two three realms: firstly, the realm of cultivated lands, secondly the realm of wastelands and forests (/), and thirdly the realm of spirits. Grāmya and / form part of the tangible world, whereas  is their intangible counterpart. The world of the forest is the "world of the wild, unordered, uncontrolled, hungry beings of destruction".

The world of the forest and the world of the spirits are therefore seen as mirror images of each other. The wild animals threatening the human cultivator and his fields such as the tiger, the snake, the wild-boar, and the bison, find their mirror images in their corresponding būtas Pilli, Naga, Paňjurli and Maisandaya.

The relationship between these three worlds is one of balance and moral order. If this order is upset by the humans, it is believed that the spirits become vicious. If the order is maintained, the spirits are believed to be supportive and benevolent. Thus, the spirits of Tulu culture are neither "good" nor "bad" as such; they are "neither cruel nor capricious. They methodically and persistently remind a lax humanity of the need for morality and the value of solidarity". Nobody is believed to be above the moral and cosmological norms of this threefold universe, not even the spirits or the gods. Thus the būtas are not whimsical or arbitrary in their judgement. The būtas are their patron's protectors with regard to a system of moral norms, not despite them.

Feudal relations of tribute and fealty mark the relations among the humans in the tangible world, among spirits in the intangible world and between humans and spirits across tangible and intangible worlds. While the world of humans is ruled by a mortal king, the world of the spirits is ruled by Bermeru, the lord of the forest and of the būtas. And just as the landed aristocracy depended on protection and support from their king, the world of humans depends on protection and support from the spirits. Thus once in a year at the time of kōla or nēma, the lord of the human world (patriarch, landlord, king) has to be reconfirmed in his authority by reporting to the spirit to which he is accountable. While the temporal lord's authority is dependent on the spirit; the authority of the spirit is guaranteed by the active participation of the villagers in the ritual. Thereby a certain degree of political legitimacy is upheld by the active participation of the villagers. Their withdrawal from the ritual can seriously affect the authority of the landlord.

Tribal communities living in and off the forest and trading in forest products were predestined to serve as spirit impersonators as their life world, the forest, is only the tangible side of the world of the spirits. In pursuit of their livelihood they regularly transgress structural boundaries between village and forest. They live on the margins of the village, in the wasteland between forest and field, thus they are themselves, in a sense, liminal. That such liminal people should be mediums for the spirits seems entirely apt. They are mostly landless agricultural labourers in the wet season and spirit impersonators in the dry season.

Worship 

Today feudal relations no longer obtain and thus former ruling families no longer hold any political or judicial office. But still the village demands that they sponsor their annual kōla or nēma to honour the village deity. The people believe that the neglect of the spirits will make their life miserable. Even though they may have changed, būta kōla and daiva nēma still serve secular as well as religious purposes. In fact the two cannot be separated in a world where the tangible is suffused with the intangible. As the cosmology underlying the pāḍdanas suggests, the very order of the human world and the order of the spirit world are interdependent.

Būtas and daivas are not worshipped on a daily basis like mainstream Hindu gods. Their worship is restricted to annual ritual festivals, though daily pūjās may be conducted for the ritual objects, ornaments, and other paraphernalia of the būta. Unlike with the better-known Hindu gods of the purāṇic variety, būta worship is congregational.

Secular function 
The secular function of the kōla or nēma has been described as a "sacred court of justice" where traditional (feudal) moral ideals are brought to bear on difficult real-life situations. Būta kōlas and daiva nēmas are assemblies of the entire village. Thus they become an occasion to resolve conflicts in the village. The royal daiva (rājan-daiva) rules over a former small kingdom or large feudal estate. He or she is mostly the family deity of rich land-owning patrons of the Baṇṭ caste whose position and power they reflect, confirm and renew. The relationship between the būtas, manor heads, and the villagers forms a transactional network which reaffirms the caste hierarchy and power relations in a village. The duty assigned to every category is differential but based on mutuality. The manor head by staging the nēma seeks to symbolically proclaim himself to be the natural leader of the community.

The villagers offer sēva during the nēma in the form of service and prostrations and in doing so also offer their support to the nēma and their recognition of the leader's status. In return, the villagers expect justice and resolution of disputes by the daiva during the nēma. In the nēma, the leading manors offer a part of their farm products to the daiva, which are then redistributed to the villagers. The nēma thereby underlines the mutuality on which feudal relations used to be based and, in a limited way, takes care of the problem of social (distributive) justice. The būtas receive these offerings and in return give oracles and blessings to ensure the future prosperity of the village (humans, animals, fields). Finally, a part of these offerings will be distributed as prasāda among the heads of the guṭṭus and other villagers according to their ranks. The system of entitlements is constituted in, or embodied by, the mutual gifting activity between the būtas, as the ultimate owner of the land, and people in rituals, creating a transactional network among them.

Ritual script 
The script of the ritual changes from one nēmā to another, thus the following description is somewhat ideal-typical. The ritual begins with the paraphernalia of the būta being brought to the shrine which serves as a venue for the festival. They are placed on an altar or on a swinging cot, which is the insignium of a royal būta (rajan-daiva). The Nalike, Parava or Pambada medium prepares for the impersonation of the spirit with a recital of from the pāḍdana of the būta or daiva. After this, the medium starts putting on make-up and dressing up in his costume which may include an elaborate ani (a giant halo stringed to the back of the dancer). Finally, the medium is given the ornaments from the hoard of the shrine. As he enters the arena, the attendant of the spirit (pātri) gives him his sword, his bell and other paraphernalia and the patron (jajmān) gives him one or several burning torches. As the medium begins to dance, the spirit enters his body. Two people hold the torches along with the medium at all times. Thus, the entrance of spirit into this world is restrained. The medium's dance gains more force as the possession continues. He brings the torches dangerously close to his body. The jajmān now stands in a ritualistic circle on the ground with his assistants and offerings are made to the būta. These offerings often include the sacrifice of a chicken whose blood is sprinkled on the ground to enhance the fertility of the land. These sacrificial acts are followed by offerings of puffed rice, beaten rice, coconut pieces, bananas, ghee, betel leaf, and areca nut. In the subsequent court of justice the spirit is approached by the villagers for blessings or asked to help resolve conflicts. The judicial program typically starts once the initial rituals are finished. Complaints and judgements are made orally. The būta issues the judgement after hearing the sides of the plaintiff as well as the defendant, if both are present. The būta's justice must be referrable to general principles. "He may take a stand, he cannot take sides". While the būta may take the opinions of the village headman and other eminent persons into consideration, the ultimate judgement rests with the būta. Sometimes judgements are also issued by the tossing of betel leaves and the counting of flower petals (usually areca flower). Particularly difficult cases may also be adjourned to the next year by the būta. Some common disputes that come up are related to land issues, family feuds, questions of honour, robbery, debt, mortgage, breach of contract etc. In cases of theft where the offender is unknown, the būta may ask for a certain offering before finding the thief. At times the victim offers the entire value of the stolen goods to the būta. If the thief is found and penalised, the person is made to pay to the plaintiff a sum that is more than the value of the goods stolen. If the būta feels that the thief shows repentance, the gravity of the penalty could be reduced.

Channel/Medium 

The art of being a channel/medium is learned. Young boys belonging to the Pambada, Parava, Nalike castes attend rituals where their kin is performing; and they help out with shredding the coconut leaves for the garment of the channel/medium, holding the mirror while the channel/medium is putting on the make up etc. They learn the art of the performance by observing the performance of their kin and trying to mimic it. Along with being able to mimic the way their kin performed, what is essential to be a successful channel/medium is also the aptitude of being possessed by the deity. There are certain rules the channel/medium needs to follow to prepare his body for the possession. This may include being a vegetarian and not drinking alcohol. The channel/medium feels the sudden spirit possession only for a few seconds but after that he is filled with the deity's energy that lets him behave as the deity for the entire ritual.

There are two types of mediators between the spirits and the humans. The first type of mediator is known as the pātri. These are members of middle castes such as  Billava (toddy tappers, formerly also bow-men). The second type of mediator ("channels/mediums") typically belong to scheduled castes such as Pambada, Parava or Nalike. While the pātri has only a sword and a bell as ritual tools, the channel/medium uses makeup, ornaments, masks etc. Both mediums are believed to channelise the deity from an altered state of consciousness. But while the channel/medium may speak as the būta (in the first person) and about the būta (in the third person, i.e. when he recounts his/her pāḍdana), the pātri only speaks as the būta in the first person.

Pāḍdana 
Pāḍdanas are songs that form a major part of Tuluva oral literature. Much of the body of this literature has been built on the legends of the būtas and daivas. Pāḍdanas have numerous variations for the same narrative. As in other epic traditions, there is no single author. Pāḍdanas are orally transmitted and recited. The language of the pāḍdanas is old Tulu. Some famous examples are the Siri-Kumar Pāḍdanas and the Koti and Chennayya Pāḍdanas. The pāḍdanas sung by women while planting paddy are referred to as "field songs".

The pāḍdanas recite the origins of the spirits and deities. This is one way for the rituals to reconstruct the past and render a legitimization to it. The singers act as the indigenous narrators of the history of the native land. The pāḍdanas also stand in opposition to the puranic, male based principles as they highlight the feminine principles of mother earth. The pāḍdanas also reflect multi-socio-cultural background shifts (for example, the move from Matrilineal system to Patrilineal system). The older sense of cosmology is retained through the pāḍdanas. The pāḍdanas also reflect processes of Hinduisation and Sanskritization.

In popular culture 
 The 1975 Kannada movie Chomana Dudi was the first movie to have a reference to the demi-god Panjurli.
 Koti Chennaya, a 2007 movie made in Tulu which went to win the Best Tulu Film at the 54th National Film Awards.
 Deyi Baidethi, a 2019 Tulu-language historical film on the life of Deyi Baideti, mother of Koti and Chennayya.
 Bhuta Kola is portrayed in the main storyline of the 2022 Kannada film Kantara. The Karnataka Government announced a monthly allowance for Bhuta kola performers over 60 years of age due to the movie.

Gallery

See also 
Aati kalenja
Yakshagana
Nagamandala
Varaha
Gulikan Theyyam
Theyyam

Notes

References

External links 
 

Dances of India
Ritual dances
Tuluva
Culture of Tulu Nadu
Shamanism